The Pariah, the Parrot, the Delusion is the fourth studio album by American alternative rock band Dredg, released on June 9, 2009, on Ohlone Recordings. Bassist Drew Roulette describes the album as "a rock and roll record, filled with experimental journeys and eccentric jousts," and states that the album is inspired by a Salman Rushdie essay, entitled Imagine There Is No Heaven: A Letter to the Six Billionth Citizen.

Two singles ("Saviour" and "I Don't Know") were released on iTunes on May 5, 2009. A third single, "Information", was released on May 22, 2009.

The liner notes dedicate the album to the late Deftones bassist Chi Cheng, who was left in a coma resulting from a catastrophic car accident while the band was working on the album.

Track listing

References

External links
 http://www.dredg.com/

Dredg albums
2009 albums